Daniel Sirera Bellés (born 30 July 1967 in Badalona) is a Spanish politician. He served as the chairman of the People's Party in Catalonia (PPC) from 2007–2008.

He is currently a deputy in the Parliament of Catalonia for the constituency of Barcelona and is the leader of the PPC's parliamentary group. Between 2007 and 2008, Sirera was Senator.

Sirera, who was born in Badalona, is a law graduate of the University of Barcelona.

He is a former columnist for right-wing outlet Libertad Digital.

References

1967 births
Living people
People from Badalona
Sportspeople from the Province of Barcelona
People's Party (Spain) politicians
Members of the Parliament of Catalonia
Members of the Senate of Spain
University of Barcelona alumni
Members of the 5th Parliament of Catalonia